Kalbach is a municipality in the district of Fulda, in Hesse, Germany. Kalbach is about 20 km south of the city of Fulda and 90 km east-northeast of Frankfurt. Kalbach encompasses the communities of Eichenried, Heubach, Mittelkalbach, Niederkalbach, Oberkalbach, Uttrichshausen and Veitsteinbach.

References

Municipalities in Hesse
Fulda (district)